Bhojpura is a patwar circle and village in Phagi Tehsil in Jaipur district, Rajasthan, India. As a patwar circle, it includes the nearby village of Datooli.

At the 2011 Census of India, Bhojpura was reported to have 220 households and a population of 1,451 (with 51.83% males and 48.17% females).

There is one primary school in Bhojpura village.

References 

Villages in Jaipur district